General elections were held in the Isle of Man between 23 and 29 November 1934. Independent candidates won a majority of seats in the House of Keys.

Electoral system
The 24 members of the House of Keys were elected from 11 constituencies, which had between one and three seats.

Campaign
A total of 39 candidates contested the elections; 30 independents, seven from the Manx Labour Party and two from Independent Labour.

Results

By constituency

References

general election
1934
Manx general election
Manx general election